Kolathiri or Kolathiri Rājā (King of Kolathunādu or King of Cannanore in foreign accounts) was the title by which the senior-most male along the matrilineal line of the Mushika or Kolathunādu Royal Family (Kolaswarũpam) based at North Malabar region was styled. It's a descendent of the Mushika dynasty. The Indian anthropologist Ayinapalli Aiyappan states that a powerful and warlike clan of the Bunt community of Tulu Nadu was called Kola Bari and the Kolathiri Raja of Kolathunadu was a descendant of this clan. The Kolathiri family and the Travancore family reciprocally adopted girl-children from each other for several centuries right into the 1990s.

Cultural depictions

"Kolathiri" appears as a character in a Malayalam film titled Urumi. The film was loosely based on Portuguese interference in north Kerala and the misdeeds committed by Vasco da Gama, who was hailed as a hero in the west but was actually a cold-hearted tyrant to other lands of the spice route; his entry into Kerala politics and manipulating the kingpins and a young Indian who tries to kill Vasco da Gama. The movie was released on 31 March 2011.

References

Dynasties of India
History of Kerala
Former monarchies of Asia
Historical Indian regions